The 2013 ASB Chatham Cup was New Zealand's 86th knockout football competition.

The 2013 competition had a qualification round and four rounds proper, before quarter-finals, semi-finals, and a final. Competition was run in three regions (Northern, Central, Southern) until the quarter-finals, from which stage the draw was open. In all, 132 teams entered the competition.

The 2013 final
The final was played in front of a crowd of 2,000 spectators. Cashmere Technical took an early lead in the 5th minute when Julyan Collett was fouled in the penalty area and Danny Boys sent Waitakere City goalkeeper Eamon Goodin the wrong way. The lead was short lived when just 10 minutes later, Cashmere conceded their first and what would be their only goal of the whole campaign. Waitakere won a free kick 25 metres out and Jake Butler lined up his shot. It went straight into the defensive wall but from the rebound his follow up put the ball past Cashmere keeper Shaun Roberts. It didn't take long for Cashmere to restore there lead when Stu Kelly was rewarded for his hard work, slotting the ball home in the 23rd minute. From there both teams had their chances but the result was finally put beyond doubt in injury time when, spotting the keeper off his line, Dan Ede put in a deft long-range lob and the game finished 3–1.

The Jack Batty Memorial Cup for the final's most valuable player was awarded to Cashmere Technical's Andy Pitman.

Results

Qualification round
All fixtures, results and dates are taken from the following sources: The Ultimate New Zealand Soccer Website, RSSSF, Capital Football Season Review, and New Zealand Football.

Northern region

Central region

Southern region

All teams listed below received byes to the first round.
Northern: Air Force, Hukanui Rototuna, Navy, Papakura City, Pukekohe.
Central: FC Western, Napier City Rovers, Inglewood, Palmerston North Marist, Red Sox Manawatu, Taradale, Wanganui City.
Southern: FC Nelson, Nelson College, Richmond Athletic.

All teams listed below were seeded to the first round.
Northern: Albany United, Claudelands Rovers, Eastern Suburbs, Fencibles, Forrest Hill Milford, Glenfield Rovers, Hibiscus Coast, Lynn Avon United, Mangere United, Manukau City, Melville United, Metro, Mt Albert Ponsonby, Ngaruawahia United, North Shore United, Onehunga Mangere United, Oratia United, Papatoetoe, Takapuna, Tauranga City United, Waiuku, Warkworth, Western Springs.
Central: Brooklyn Northern United, Eastbourne, Greytown, Island Bay United, Kapiti Coast United, Lower Hutt City, Marist, Miramar Rangers, Naenae, North Wellington, Olympic, Petone, Seatoun, Stokes Valley, Stop Out, Tawa, Upper Hutt City, Victoria University, Wainuiomata, Wairarapa United, Waterside Karori, Wellington College, Wellington United, Western Suburbs.
Southern: Coastal Spirit, FC Twenty 11, Grants Braes, Green Island, Halswell United, Melchester Rovers, Mosgiel, Nomads United, Northern, Northern Hearts, Old Boys, Otago University, Queens Park, Roslyn Wakari, Selwyn United, Southend United, Universities, Waihopai, Waimak United, Western AFC.

All teams listed below were seeded to the second round.
Northern: Bay Olympic, Birkenhead United, Central United, East Coast Bays, Ellerslie, Hamilton Wanderers, Manurewa, Onehunga Sports, Three Kings United, Waitakere City.
Southern: Cashmere Technical, Caversham, Dunedin Technical, Ferrymead Bays.

Round 1
All fixtures, results and dates are taken from the following sources: The Ultimate New Zealand Soccer Website, RSSSF,  Capital Football Season Review and New Zealand Football.

Northern region

Central region

Southern region

*both sides used unregistered players and were disqualified

Round 2
All fixtures, results and dates are taken from the following sources: The Ultimate New Zealand Soccer Website, RSSSF,  Capital Football Season Review and New Zealand Football.

Northern region

Central region

Southern region

Round 3
All fixtures, results and dates are taken from the following sources: The Ultimate New Zealand Soccer Website, RSSSF,  Capital Football Season Review and New Zealand Football.

Northern region

Central region

Southern region

Round 4
All fixtures, results and dates are taken from the following sources: The Ultimate New Zealand Soccer Website, RSSSF,  Capital Football Season Review and New Zealand Football.

Northern region

Central region

Southern region

Quarter-finals
All fixtures, results and dates are taken from the following sources: The Ultimate New Zealand Soccer Website, RSSSF,  Capital Football Season Review and New Zealand Football.

Semi-finals
All fixtures, results and dates are taken from the following sources: The Ultimate New Zealand Soccer Website, RSSSF,  Capital Football Season Review and New Zealand Football.

Final
All fixtures, results and dates are taken from the following sources: The Ultimate New Zealand Soccer Website, RSSSF,  Capital Football Season Review and New Zealand Football. Team lists and numbers taken from NZ Football on Youtube.

References

External links
 Archive of ASB Chatham Cup Website

Chatham Cup
2012–13 in New Zealand association football
2013 domestic association football cups